Birthright Armenia, also known as Depi Hayk, is a volunteer internship enhancement program that also offers travel fellowships to eligible participants to assist in the development of Armenia.

Organizational background 

Birthright Armenia was established in 2003 by Edele Hovnanian as an international nonprofit organization. The organization's goals include strengthening ties between Armenia and Armenian Diaspora youth representatives by providing them an opportunity to take part in the daily life of fellow Armenians.

Applicants need only be either full or partial Armenian descent, between the ages of 21–32, and must agree to a minimum 9 week stay. As of 2022, over 3,000 individuals from more than 48 countries have participated in the Birthright Armenia program.

Similar organizations 

Birthright Armenia was inspired by Birthright Israel, which offers educational and cultural exchange opportunities related to Jewish history and culture. Another similar project is Birthright Greece, aimed at the Greek Diaspora.

See also 
 Diaspora tourism
 Genealogy tourism
 Repatriation of Armenians
 Overseas Citizenship of India, a scheme allowing foreign citizens with ancestral origins in British India to obtain permanent residency in India
 Year of Return, Ghana 2019

References

External links 
 
 Birthright Armenia - Subject of USC case study "Moving Forward"
 Volunteerism in The Homeland, Part I: Redefining Service: Philanthropist Edele Hovnanian

2003 establishments in Armenia
Armenian diaspora
Cultural heritage
Cultural exchange
Youth organizations based in Armenia
Yerevan
Organizations established in 2003